Holy Cross Abbey is a monastery of the Catholic Order of Cistercians of the Strict Observance (OCSO), popularly known as the Trappists. The monastery is located near Berryville in the Shenandoah Valley of Virginia, United States. The main building was built as a hunting lodge in 1784 by William Wormeley, nephew of Ralph Wormeley, who bought the land at the suggestion of friend George Washington.

History
The order of monks that occupy the abbey originated in Valley Falls, Rhode Island, but their monastery, Our Lady of the Valley, was gutted by fire on March 21, 1950. The monks temporarily occupied an abandoned Civilian Conservation Corps camp, and moved into the Virginia location on November 18, 1950.

The monks make and sell fruitcakes and creamed honey and they own and operate a natural cemetery and a retreat house where guests can stay for several days at a time.  Guests at the retreat house are requested to contribute to the atmosphere of silence and prayer.

During the Civil War, the Battle of Cool Spring was fought on what is now the monastery grounds.

It was also featured in an article by the Washington Post commending it for its quiet location and beautiful scenery.

Historic buildings and structures

Holy Cross Abbey (1784)

References

External links
Holy Cross Abbey Website
Holy Cross Abbey Celebrates 50th Anniversary, The Catholic Herald, 11/30/00.

Trappist monasteries in the United States
Houses completed in 1784
Buildings and structures in Clarke County, Virginia
Tourist attractions in Clarke County, Virginia
Roman Catholic Diocese of Arlington